Family Tree is a 2010 French film directed by Olivier Ducastel and Jacques Martineau. It drew its inspiration in large measure from the life of Pierre Seel, an Alsatian homosexual deported to the camp of Schirmeck, who wrote of his experiences in a book, Moi, Pierre Seel, déporté homosexuel. The film won the Prix Jean Vigo in 2009.

Cast
 Guy Marchand as Frédérick
 Françoise Fabian as Marianne
 Sabrina Seyvecou as Delphine
 Yannick Renier as Rémi
 François Negret as Guillaume
 Catherine Mouchet as Françoise
 Sandrine Dumas as Elisabeth
 Pierre-Loup Rajot as Charles, oldest son of Frédérick and Marianne

References

External links

2010 films
French LGBT-related films
Films directed by Olivier Ducastel
Films directed by Jacques Martineau
2010 LGBT-related films
LGBT-related drama films
2010 drama films
2010s French-language films
2010s French films